LPF may refer to:

 IATA code for Liupanshui Yuezhao Airport, China
 League for Programming Freedom, an organization promoting free software
 Lembaga Penapis Filem, or the Film Censorship Board of Malaysia
 Level playing field
 Libertarian Party of Florida
 Lietuvos plaukimo federacija, Lithuanian Swimming Federation
 Liga Panameña de Fútbol, a professional football league in Panama
 Liga Profesional de Fútbol, a professional football league in Argentina
 Liga Profesionistă de Fotbal, a professional football league governing body in Romania
 Light press fit, an interference fit in engineering
 Linux packet filter in computing
 LISA Pathfinder, a European Space Agency spacecraft
 Liters per flush, as shown on American urinals "1 gpf/3.7 lpf"
 Low-pass filter, type of signal filter in acoustics
 Low-power field, in microscopic examination, a wide field of view due to a low level of magnification
 Nissan Stadium (formerly LP Field), a stadium in Nashville, Tennessee; home of the Tennessee Titans
 Pim Fortuyn List, Dutch political party